Moray East Wind Farm is an offshore wind farm located in the Moray Firth off the coast of Scotland.

History 
The wind farm received consent in 2014, and received a Contract for difference (CfD) at £57.50 per MWhr in 2017.

The wind farm began exporting power in June 2021. The final turbine was installed in September 2021.

Full power output was achieved in April 2022 and was commissioned. However, as market prices had increased above the CfD price due to the 2021 United Kingdom natural gas supplier crisis, the operator deferred the CfD start.

Technology 
The wind farm includes 100 9.5 MW turbines from Vestas for a total generating capacity of 950 MW. The wind farm uses three 220 kV AC export cables to transmit generated power to the national grid. The operations and maintenance base for the wind farm is located in Fraserburgh.

See also 
 Moray West Wind Farm

References

External links 
 Official website

Offshore wind farms in the North Sea
Wind farms in Scotland